Midford Halt railway station was open between 1911 and 1915 in Somerset, England.  The halt was on the Limpley Stoke to Camerton railway that formed part of the Great Western Railway's development of the former Bristol and North Somerset Railway, and which followed the former Somerset Coal Canal. The line was only open to passenger traffic for seven years in all, from 1910 to 1915, and from 1923 to 1925; Midford Halt opened a year late and then did not reopen for the second period.

Midford Halt was in Wiltshire; the county boundary runs up to the B3110 road at the point where the canal and railway crossed the road, and the halt was on the Wiltshire side.

The halt was about 400 metres northeast of Midford station which was on the Somerset and Dorset Joint Railway line.

References

External links
 Midford Halt station on navigable 1919 O. S. map

Disused railway stations in Wiltshire
Railway stations in Great Britain opened in 1911
Railway stations in Great Britain closed in 1915
Former Great Western Railway stations